Tobey Torres-Doran (born Tobey Kristine Torres;  ; April 6, 1972) is an American singer and musician. She is best known as the frontwoman of the industrial rock band Snake River Conspiracy (SRC) across three stints, from 1998 to 2004, in 2006, and again since 2022. Outside of Snake River Conspiracy, she also fronts the electronic rock band Mojave Phone Booth, which she founded with her husband/SRC guitarist Mitchell J. Doran.

Early life 
Tobey Torres was born on April 6, 1972 in Fremont, California, and spent her childhood growing up in Mammoth Lakes, California. Growing up, Torres played volleyball and sung in a variety of cover bands, mainly doing the Stevie Nicks vocals of Fleetwood Mac songs. She also participated in a variety of singing contests.

In 1992, Torres attained a volleyball scholarship with California State University. During her tenure at the university from 1992 to 1993, she achieved several team season records as a middle blocker. While she considered turning professional, Torres ultimately dropped out of the university due to her disinterest with the more academic side of the sport. “I couldn’t put up with all the bullshit. My thing was the aggression of the game. I didn’t care about the rest of it.”

Afterwards, she took up modelling, and after being suggested by photographers to try it out, Torres took up work as an go-go dancer at T's Club in San Jose, California, where she was paid $1,500 for three days' work per week over the course of two years.

Career

Snake River Conspiracy (1998–2003) 
In 1998, Torres met Snake River Conspiracy co-founder Jason Slater, who asked her if she could sing on a cover version of The Cure's "Lovesong".  Torres agreed, and, impressed by her ability to scream, Slater and SRC's other co-founder Eric Valentine recruited Torres as the band's main singer. Shortly thereafter, Snake River Conspiracy signed to Interscope Records, although the band would later move to Reprise Records in 1999. While Torres did not make any major contributions to the overall compositions, she provided some uncredited lyrical contributions to some of the songs on Snake River Conspiracy's debut album, Sonic Jihad (2000), most notably with "Breed".

Torres spent the next year or so touring with Snake River Conspiracy in support of Sonic Jihad. From April to June 2000, she toured alongside Filter and Veruca Salt. Shortly after the tour's conclusion, Torres' mother, Angie, died on June 8, 2000 from liver failure brought on by alcoholism. This prompted Torres to become sober, which improved the quality of her live performances. Afterwards, the band toured across the United States as part of the "Bush/Gore 2000: Industrial Not Political" tour with Rorscrach Test, Bile and Videodrone, and thereafter travelled to Europe and the United Kingdom for a touring leg there from October to November 2000 as support for Monster Magnet and Queens of the Stone Age. Snake River Conspiracy planned to do a second UK tour leg with My Ruin and SugarComa in December 2000, though this was cancelled after SRC drummer Neil Taylor broke his wrists after falling down a flight of stairs. From January to March 2001, Snake River Conspiracy toured as support for A Perfect Circle. Reprise pulled the band's touring support shortly thereafter, and the band ceased touring.

While Sonic Jihad was not a commercial success, it was warmly received, especially in the British rock and heavy metal press.  Torres soon formed a relationship with Kerrang!, and became a semi-regular fixture in the magazine; most notably, she was a co-presenter at the 2001 Kerrang! Awards. Torres also gained favourability with the magazine's readers, who voted her into second and third place in the "She-Babe" category in the Kerrang! Readers' Polls of 2000 and 2001, respectively.

In January 2001, Torres moved from the San Francisco Bay Area to Los Angeles. There, Snake River Conspiracy started working on a second album tentatively known as SRC2 in early 2001 at Henson Recording Studios, but in early 2002 the band was dropped by Reprise Records. Torres and the other members worked on the album for the next year or so afterward.

Solo stint and return to Snake River Conspiracy (2004–2006) 
On February 26, 2004, Tobey Torres quit Snake River Conspiracy, and was replaced by ex-Drain STH drummer/vocalist Martina Axén. After leaving Snake River Conspiracy, Torres made a few guest appearances on releases by Deckard and Scum of the Earth, and attempted to work on a solo album. During early 2006 she released three demo songs, "Enamored", "Bi-Polar" and "Disengaged", through her MySpace page. The demos showed Torres moving in a more alternative rock direction. However, Torres soon lost interest in pursuing a solo career, and later stated that she wasn't connecting with the various producers she tried working with. 

On May 4, 2006, Snake River Conspiracy announced via an episode of their official podcast, titled "She's Back", that Torres had re-joined Snake River Conspiracy. However, her return to the band was brief, as on September 4, 2006, Torres announced via her MySpace page that she had "once again chosen to disassociate myself from Snake River Conspiracy". SRC guitarist Mitchell Doran announced his departure via the band's vBulletin forums two days later. Following this, the band broke up.

Mojave Phone Booth and Snake River Conspiracy revival (2012–present) 
After an extended hiatus, Tobey and Mitchell Doran reappeared in 2012 with the electronic rock band Mojave Phone Booth, with Lynn Farmer of Meat Beat Manifesto joining on drums. After releasing two singles, "Funeral Dress" and "Video Creep", Mojave Phone Booth signed to Fangoria Musick, a short-lived record label of the horror film fan magazine Fangoria, in October 2015. However, the band would later leave the label, and their debut album, Mojave Phone Booth, was self-released on October 31, 2016.

After another period of inactivity, Mojave Phone Booth began recording a new album, Hollow the Numbers, and worked on the album from June 2021 to June 2022.  In preparation for the album's release, the band released a limited edition EP, Kill the Messenger, on August 8, 2022; the EP contained two songs from Hollow the Numbers and two previously unreleased tracks. Hollow the Numbers was released on October 28, 2022. Red Hot Chilli Peppers bassist Flea makes a guest appearance on one of the album's tracks.

In July 2022, Snake River Conspiracy launched a new Instagram account, and announced that they would be releasing new Snake River Conspiracy music in 2023.

Musical style and influences 
Torres was musically influenced by a variety of new wave, electronica and alternative rock bands, such as Björk, Portishead, Eurythmics, PJ Harvey, Deftones, The Pretenders, Siouxse and the Banshees, Gang of Four, The Slits, The Motels, The Smiths and David Bowie.

Personal life 
Tobey Torres has been married to Snake River Conspiracy guitarist Mitchell J. Doran since 2006. Prior to this, she was romantically involved with Queens of the Stone Age frontman Josh Homme and Red Hot Chilli Peppers bassist Flea. Torres also makes an appearance in the music video for Red Hot Chilli Peppers' "The Zephyr Song".

Discography 
with Snake River Conspiracy

 Sonic Jihad (2000)
 SRC2 (unreleased)

with Mojave Phone Booth

 Mojave Phone Booth (2016)
 Hollow the Numbers (2022)

Solo discography

Guest appearances

References 
Citations

Sources

 
 
 
 
 
 
 
 
 
 
 
 

1972 births

Living people
People from Fremont, California

California State University alumni
California State University, Los Angeles alumni
American singers
20th-century American musicians
21st-century American musicians